Albert I of Münsterberg-Oels ( or ;  or ; 3 August 1468, Kunětická Hora Castle – 12 July 1511, Prostějov) was a member of the House of Poděbrady and a Duke of the Silesian duchies of Münsterberg and Oleśnica and Count of Kladsko.

Life 
Albert was a grandson of the King George of Podebrady of Bohemia.  His parents were Henry the Elder of Münsterberg and  Ursula of Brandenburg, daughter of the Elector Albrecht III Achilles, Elector of Brandenburg.

In 1487, Albert married Salome (1475/76-1514), a daughter of Duke John II of Żagań and Großglogau.  In 1488, his younger brothers George and Charles also married daughters of John II.

After their father's death in 1498, the three brothers Albert, George and Charles ruled jointly at first, though each lived at his own court: Albert in Kłodzko, Georg in Oleśnica, Charles in Münsterberg and after 1530 in his newly built castle in Frankenstein.  The three brothers sold the County of Kladsko in 1501 to their future brother-in-law Ulrich of Hardegg.  However, they retained the title of "Count of Kladsko" for themselves and their descendants, until the male line of Münsterberg branch of the House of Poděbrady died out in 1647.

Albrecht and Salome had a daughter Ursula (1498–1545).  In 1517, she married  Henry Riesenberg, who died in 1551.

References 
  (added entry in the article Johann II., Herzog von Glogau und Sagan)
  (added entry in the article Johann II., Herzog in Schlesien und Herr zu Sagan)
 Arno Herzig, Małgorzata Ruchniewicz: Geschichte des Glatzer Landes, Hamburg-Wrocław, 2006, p. 54–59

External links 
 

1468 births
1511 deaths
Dukes of Münsterberg
Podiebrad family